Alan Tyrer (8 December 1942 – January 2008) was an English professional footballer who played as a midfielder in the Football League for Everton, Mansfield Town, Bury and Workington, and was on the books of Arsenal without making a league appearance.

References

1942 births
2008 deaths
Footballers from Liverpool
English footballers
Association football midfielders
Everton F.C. players
Mansfield Town F.C. players
Arsenal F.C. players
Bury F.C. players
Workington A.F.C. players
English Football League players